Valencia Park is an urban community in the southeastern section of the city of San Diego. It is bordered by Emerald Hills and Market Street on the north, Lincoln Park and Euclid Avenue on the west, Encanto on the east, and Alta Vista and National City, California on the south. Major thoroughfares include Imperial Avenue, Churchward Street, and Valencia Parkway.

History
Part of the property at Valencia Park Elementary (playground area) was donated by local resident and San Diego Real Estate entrepreneur Astor Basmajian. An earlier resident of this community, Astor bought several pieces of property within Valencia Park as well as property throughout San Diego County. From buying and selling homes that were already there, as well as building a subdivision of new homes within the neighborhood which was later named Astor Heights, he helped contribute to the earlier history of the Valencia Park community. Astor Basmajian, an immigrant from Armenia, escaped the genocide early and became a millionaire twice in his lifetime. A jeweler by trade, he and his brother opened a jewelry shop in New York shortly before World War I. Both brothers served in the war. After returning from the war, Astor continued his business and later moved to Ohio, and then on to California where he remained the rest of his life living out the "American Dream."

With the great influx of Filipino immigrants joining the United States Navy, especially from the Vietnam War era on to the 1990s, many Filipinos inhabited the Southeast San Diego neighborhoods of Alta Vista, Bay Terraces, Paradise Hills, Shelltown, Skyline Hills, and Valencia Park, both for the relatively affordable housing prices and its close proximity to Naval Base San Diego.

Demographics
Valencia Park is a diverse community with one of the most significant African-American populations in the City. Current demographics for the neighborhood are as follows: people of Hispanic heritage make up 52.6%, followed by African-American at 26.4%, then Asian at 15.6%, non-Hispanic Whites at 3.4%, Mixed Race at 2.0% and others at 0.1%. It ranked near the very bottom at 121 out of 125 San Diego neighborhoods in terms of lowest percentage of non-Hispanic whites, and 4 out of 125 San Diego neighborhoods in terms of total population that is non-White (roughly 96.6%), topped only by bordering Lincoln Park, San Ysidro, and Southcrest.

Landmarks and facilities
Valencia Park shares Market Creek Plaza, a shopping center, with neighboring Lincoln Park.

A portion of Chollas Creek runs through Valencia Park.

Education
Valencia Park is served by the San Diego Unified School District. Public schools in Valencia Park include Valencia Park Elementary School, Nye Elementary School, Lincoln High School in bordering Lincoln Park, Morse High School in nearby Skyline, and The O'Farrell Charter Schools, an organization of charter schools located in bordering O'Farrell Park.

Much like the rest of Southeast San Diego, many students in Valencia Park have taken advantage of San Diego Unified School District's Voluntary Enrollment Exchange Program (VEEP), and have opted to be bused to high schools in San Diego's more affluent northern suburban neighborhoods,. Depending on their VEEP Allied School Pattern, a high school student may be voluntarily bused to Mira Mesa High School, Mission Bay High School, Scripps Ranch High School, Serra High School, and University City High School.

See also

References

Neighborhoods in San Diego